The Flieger Flab Museum (English: Swiss Air Force Museum) is located in the Canton of Zurich in Dübendorf on the grounds of Dübendorf Air Base. In the museum, 40 airplanes and helicopters are displayed, with the collection divided into distinct eras: pioneers and World War I, the 1930s, World War II and the postwar period,  the beginning of the jet age, the development of jet fighters, the Cold War, and arms reduction.

History
The collection was founded in 1972 by the Office for Military Airfields and dedicated to the history of Swiss military aviation and air defense. In 1972–1978,  the collection was turned over to the state by the Swiss Federal Office for military airfields. In 1978, for the first time, the public were able to contribute to the collection, which grew steadily over the next few years. Finally, in 1979, the Friends of the Museum of the Swiss air force (VFMF) was formed, initiated by Hans Giger, the Director of the Federal Office for military airfields.

During the presidency of former Federal Councillor Rudolf Heinrich Friedrich between 1985 and 1988, the club built a new exhibition hall with the help of donations. This extension, a concrete-shell structure designed by engineer Heinz Isler, was inaugurated in 1988 by former Federal Councillor Arnold Koller. A year earlier, the federal government took over the financial responsibility for the operation of the museum. Ten years later, in 1997, the VFMF and the Association of Friends of flab (VF-flab) merged with the Friends of the Swiss Air Force AFL. In 2002, a new hall was opened.

Exhibits

Aircraft

 ADS-95 Ranger 
 Alouette II
 Alouette III
 BAe Hawk
 Bücker Bü 131
 Bücker Bü 181
 Blériot XI
 Dassault Mirage IIIS 
 Dassault Mirage IIIRS
 De Havilland Vampire DH.100
 De Havilland Vampire DH.115 Trainer 
 de Havilland Venom DH-112 
 de Havilland Venom DH-112 reconnaissance version 
 N-20.2 Arbalète
 N-20.10 Aiguillon
 EKW C-36 C-3603
 FFA P-16
 Fieseler Fi 156 Storch
 Hanriot HD.1
 Hawker Hunter F.Mk.58 and T.Mk.68
 Hiller UH-12B
 Messerschmitt Bf 109
 Messerschmitt Bf 108-B Taifun
 Morane-Saulnier D-3800
 North American P-51D Mustang
 Nieuport 28
 Northrop F-5E erected in front of museum in Patrouille Suisse paint
 Northrop F-5E in standard gray paint on loan from the Air Force
 Northrop F-5F in standard gray paint on loan from the Air Force
 Pilatus P-2
 Pilatus P-3
 Pilatus PC-7 Turbo trainer
 Pilatus PC-9
 Rockwell Grand Commander 680FL

Simulators 
 Boeing 737-222 cockpit section
 Dassault Mirage IIIDS
 Dassault Mirage IIIS
 Pilatus P-3
 F/A-18C
 Boeing 747-338 cockpit section (May 2017)

Other exhibits
 Bristol BL-64 Bloodhound
 Fire control radar Mark VII 
 FLORIDA Airspace monitoring and management system
 Flt Gt63 /69' Super Fledermaus
 LGR-1 Radar
 Oerlikon 35 mm twin cannon
 Oerlikon 20 mm cannon
 RSA Missile
 RSE Kriens (Missile)
 Saurer M6 radio truck
 SRF Airspace monitoring and management system
 Target allocation radar TPS-1E

References

External links 

 
Tailnumbers of all aircraft of the Swiss Air Force (German only)

Aerospace museums in Switzerland
Cultural property of national significance in the canton of Zürich
Swiss Air Force
Military and war museums in Switzerland